Emil Szramek (29 September 1887 – 13 January 1942) was a Polish and Roman Catholic priest. He graduated from the University of Wrocław. He died in a Nazi concentration camp at Dachau. He is one of the 108 Martyrs of World War II who were beatified in 1999 by Pope John Paul II.

See also 
List of Nazi-German concentration camps
The Holocaust in Poland
World War II casualties of Poland

References

External links
 

1887 births
1942 deaths
20th-century Polish Roman Catholic priests
University of Wrocław alumni
People from Katowice
People from Tychy
People from Racibórz
People from the Province of Silesia
Polish people who died in Dachau concentration camp
108 Blessed Polish Martyrs